Heineken Lager Beer, or simply Heineken is a pale lager beer with 5% alcohol by volume produced by the Dutch brewing company Heineken N.V. Heineken beer is sold in a green bottle with a red star.

History
On 15 February 1864, Gerard Adriaan Heineken (1841–1893) bought De Hooiberg (The Haystack) brewery on the Nieuwezijds Achterburgwal canal in Amsterdam, a popular working class brand founded in 1592. In 1873 after hiring a Dr. Elion (student of Louis Pasteur) to develop Heineken a yeast for Bavarian bottom fermentation, the HBM (Heineken's Bierbrouwerij Maatschappij) was established, and the first Heineken brand beer was brewed. In 1875 Heineken won the Medaille D'Or at the International Maritime Exposition in Paris and it began to be shipped there regularly, after which Heineken sales topped 64,000 hectolitres (1.7 million U.S. gallons), making them the biggest beer exporter to France.

In Heineken's early years, the beer won four awards:

Medaille d'Or (gold medal) at the International Maritime Exhibition (International Exhibition of Marine and River Industries) in Paris in May 1875.
Diplome d'Honneurs (Honorary Diploma) at the International Colonial and Export Exhibition in Amsterdam in 1883.
Grand Prix (Grand Prize) at the Exposition Universelle in Paris in 1889.
Hors Concours Membre du Jury in Paris in 1900.
The two awards that are still mentioned on the label are the Medaille d'Or and Diplome d'Honneurs.

In 2013, Heineken joined leading alcohol producers as part of a producers' commitments to reducing harmful drinking.

By the end of February 2013, Heineken had stopped producing the brown bottles used for the Dutch market in favor of the green color of bottles it already used for exports.

In 2014, Heineken celebrated its 150th anniversary. In 2015, Heineken won the Creative Marketer of the Year Award, becoming the second company to win the award twice.

The original brewery where Gerard Adriaan Heineken first started making Heineken is now the Heineken Experience Museum.

Heineken 0.0
Heineken launched its first non-alcoholic beer in 2017, naming it "Heineken 0.0". It was evaluated positively in terms of taste, with "almost the same taste" as the full-alcohol version, even though Heineken does not claim it to be of the same taste. It was also found to be lower in calories and sugar than a soda.

However, as is the case with most ‘non-alcoholic’ beers, Heineken 0.0 actually still does contain a trace amount of alcohol (about 0.05 percent). It has less alcohol than grape juice or orange juice, which naturally have some alcohol content even if lower than most drinks (0.30 to 0.86).

Production

Since 1975, most Heineken-brand beer has been brewed at their brewery in Zoeterwoude, Netherlands. In 2011, 2.74 billion litres of Heineken-brand beer were produced worldwide, while the total beer production of all breweries fully owned by the Heineken Group over all brands was 16.46 billion litres globally. As of 2022, Heineken is sold in 192 countries. They have also been incorporated with numerous beer brands in countries all over the world, including Mexico, China, Australia and various countries in Africa.

Advertising

Heineken was the major sponsor of UEFA Champions League and the UEFA Super Cup, UEFA Euro and Rugby World Cup; major sponsorship of Rugby Union had begun in Wales with the Welsh Premier Division competition.

Dating back to 1997's Tomorrow Never Dies, Heineken has retained a longstanding relationship with the Bond franchise, consecutively being featured in 8 of their films, including No Time To Die (2021). While it is usually the supporting characters seen drinking Heineken, Bond himself is seen drinking Heineken beer in Skyfall (2012) and Spectre (2015). As a long-term brand investment, Heineken reportedly spent $45 million for its inclusion on Skyfall alone, some $25 million more than Bond actor Daniel Craig's pre-residual salary. As of 2015, it is the brand's largest global marketing platform.

In 2016, Heineken became the Official Beer of the FIA Formula One World Championship starting from the Canadian Grand Prix. During races, Heineken also puts its "When You Drink, Never Drive" advertising campaign all over the race as a campaign to end drink driving.

In August 2021, Heineken signed a multi-year deal with W Series as the global partner for all-Women single-seater racing series.

Starting with the 2020–24 cycle, Heineken became the sponsors of UEFA Europa League and UEFA Europa Conference League through Heineken 0.0 brands.

Activities in Russia 
At the end of March 2022, over a month after Russia started its war in Ukraine, Heineken announced that it was leaving Russia (including with its other brands there, like Affligem, Amstel etc.), saying that ownership of the Russian subsidiary was no longer “durable or viable.” But despite this promise Heineken hired more than 240 new staff and launched no less than 61 new products on the Russian market last year, investigators from Follow the Money reported, based on an overview of 2022 by Heineken Russia. The Dutch brewer’s Russian subsidiary looked back on “a turbulent year, with many new growth opportunities.” One of these opportunities being the departure of Coca-Cola and Pepsi from Russia, which Heineken "cynically" used to "enter the non-alcoholic carbonated beverage market". Heineken announced even more investments for 2023, including more modern packaging and new flavors.

See also
 Alcohol in Iran

References

External links 

 

 
Beer in the Netherlands
Heineken brands
1873 introductions